The New Odd Couple is an American sitcom television series that aired on ABC from 1982 to 1983, and was an updated version of the 1970s television series The Odd Couple. The New Odd Couple was the second attempt to remake a series of one of Neil Simon's plays with a primarily African-American and European-American cast. The first was Barefoot in the Park (which also premiered on September 24, 1970, the same day as the original Odd Couple series).

Synopsis
In this series, Felix and Oscar were both African-American college buddies who met in the 1950s. Felix was portrayed by Ron Glass and Oscar was portrayed by Demond Wilson.  The characterizations were still the same, as Felix was a prissy neatfreak and Oscar was a fun-loving and sloppy character.  John Schuck also appeared as Murray the Cop, who was kept Caucasian, as was the character of Roy, who was played by Bart Braverman.

The show ran for 18 episodes. When production on the series began, a Hollywood writers strike was underway; as a result, eight of the early episodes recycled scripts from the original series. By the time the writers began producing new scripts, it was too late, as the show never found an audience. The series was cancelled in 1983.

Cast
 Ron Glass as Felix Unger
 Demond Wilson as Oscar Madison
 Sheila Anderson as Cecily Pigeon
 Bart Braverman as Roy
 Ronalda Douglas as Gwendolyn Pigeon
 Jo Marie Payton as Mona
 John Schuck as Murray
 Liz Torres as Maria
 Telma Hopkins as Frances

Production
The New Odd Couple was executive produced by Garry and Anthony W. Marshall, and produced by Paramount Television. The theme music was still the same as the original series (composed by Neal Hefti), but it was played with a more updated urban arrangement.

This marked the second time Ron Glass and Demond Wilson collaborated; nearly a decade prior, they appeared together in two episodes of Sanford and Son: "Card Sharps" (S2, E6) and "Once a Thief" (S4, E15).

Episodes

US TV Ratings

Syndication
Reruns of the series aired on BET in the early 1990s. TV Land occasionally aired reruns when they were airing reruns of the original 1970s series.

References

External links
 

1982 American television series debuts
1983 American television series endings
American Broadcasting Company original programming
1980s American sitcoms
1980s American black sitcoms
English-language television shows
Television series reboots
Television series based on plays
Television series by CBS Studios
Television shows set in New York City
The Odd Couple
Television series based on works by Neil Simon